Roger Norman Fry (born 18 August 1948) is an English retired footballer.

Playing career

Fry began his career as a youngster with Southampton Schools, having been a fan of Southampton since he was a young boy. While working as an apprentice at the docks in Southampton, he was spotted by the club and signed professional terms as a 19-year-old in October 1967. After 3 seasons of reserve football at Southampton he made his debut in the final game of the 1970–71 season against Crystal Palace at The Dell. Facing large amounts of competition for his place, Fry never really had an extended run in the first team but still managed 22 league games and 3 cup appearances over the next season. The following season he suffered a number of injuries and only featured in reserve matches, so he made the move to Walsall in July 1973.

At Walsall, Fry made 136 appearances over the next four seasons, before being released by manager Dave Mackay. He returned south to play for Salisbury City before joining North Baddesley in 1980.

After retirement he went into film production, before moving into the aeronautics industry.

References

1948 births
Footballers from Southampton
Living people
English footballers
Association football defenders
Southampton F.C. players
Walsall F.C. players
Salisbury City F.C. players